Adem Güven (born 11 October 1985) is a Turkish football player who currently plays for Kongsvinger.

Career
Güven was born in Konya, Turkey, but grew up in Trondheim, Norway, and started playing football for Kolstad. At age 13, his family moved to Raufoss, where Güven started his senior career with Raufoss IL. On 21 November 2007, he signed for Eliteserien club HamKam. After HamKam were relegated two seasons in a row, Güven signed for Kongsvinger in December 2009. He stayed with Kongsvinger for two seasons, before joining Odd in December 2011. He left Odd in July 2013, and then joined Turkish club Mersin İdman Yurdu. He returned to Kongsvinger in September 2015.

Career statistics

References

External links
HamKamFootball.no

1985 births
Living people
Sportspeople from Konya
Turkish footballers
Norwegian footballers
Turkish emigrants to Norway
Norwegian people of Turkish descent
Raufoss IL players
Hamarkameratene players
Kongsvinger IL Toppfotball players
Odds BK players
Mersin İdman Yurdu footballers
Norwegian Second Division players
Norwegian First Division players
Eliteserien players
TFF First League players
Süper Lig players
Association football forwards